The Bear River is a  tributary of the Yampa River.  Its source is in the Flat Tops Wilderness above Stillwater Reservoir in Garfield County, Colorado.  The Bear River flows northeast into Routt County and joins the Yampa River just east of the town of Yampa.

See also

 List of rivers of Colorado
 List of tributaries of the Colorado River

References

External links

Rivers of Garfield County, Colorado
Rivers of Routt County, Colorado
Tributaries of the Colorado River in Colorado
Rivers of Colorado